Events from the year 1128 in Ireland.

Incumbents
High King of Ireland: Toirdelbach Ua Conchobair

Births
St. Laurence O'Toole, (died 1180) or Lorcán Ua Tuathail, was born at Castledermot, County Kildare

Deaths
Mac Aodh Ua Dubhda, King of Uí Fiachrach Muaidhe

References